Sex Roles is a peer-reviewed scientific journal. It was first published in 1975 by Plenum Publishing and is currently published by Springer, Plenum's corporate heir. Articles appearing in Sex Roles are written from a feminist perspective, and topics span gender role socialization, gendered perceptions and behaviors, gender stereotypes, body image, violence against women, gender issues in employment and work environments, sexual orientation and identity, and methodological issues in gender research. The Editor-in-Chief is Janice D. Yoder.

Abstracting and indexing 
Sex Roles is abstracted/indexed in:

Abstracts in Anthropology
Australian Domestic and Family Violence Clearinghouse
Bibliosex
Cabell's
Cengage
Criminal Justice Abstracts
CSA/ProQuest
Current Abstracts
Current Contents/Social & Behavioral Sciences
Dietrich's Index Philosophicus
Educational Management Abstracts
Educational Research Abstracts Online (ERA)
Educational Technology Abstracts
EMCare
ERIH
Expanded Academic
Family & Society Studies Worldwide
FRANCIS
Gale
Higher Education Abstracts
Journal Citation Reports/Social Sciences Edition
LGBT Life
MathEDUC
Multicultural Education Abstracts
OCLC
OmniFile
PASCAL
PsycINFO
RILM Abstracts of Music Literature
Scopus
Social Sciences Citation Index
Sociology of Education Abstracts
Special Education Needs Abstracts
Studies on Women & Gender Abstracts
Technical Education & Training Abstracts
TOC Premier

According to the Journal Citation Reports, the journal has a 2020 impact factor of 4.154, ranking it 1st out of 41 journals in the category "Women's Studies" and 11th out of 62 journals in the category, "Social Psychology".

See also 
 List of women's studies journals

References 

Bimonthly journals
Gender studies journals
LGBT-related journals
Publications established in 2004
Sexology journals
Women's health
Women's studies journals